Pterodoras rivasi is a species of thorny catfish found in the Orinoco River basin of Colombia and Venezuela.  This species grows to a length of  SL.

References 
 

Doradidae
Freshwater fish of Colombia
Fish of Venezuela
Fish described in 1950